A.S.D. Sport Club Palazzolo, known as S.C. Palazzolo or just Palazzolo, is an Italian football club based in Palazzolo Acreide, in the Province of Syracuse, Sicily. As of 2019–20 season, the club played in the Eccellenza Sicily division.

founded in 1954, the club itself claimed as the successor of the original football club of the comune, which first founded in 1954 and participated in the Prima Categoria in 1955–56 season. The major club of the comune, A.C. Palazzolo A.S.D., relocated to the provincial capital also in 2013.

History
A.S.D. S.C. Palazzolo was founded in 2013 after the major football club of the comune, A.C. Palazzolo A.S.D., relocated to the provincial capital as A.S.D. Città di Siracusa. The foundation of S.C. Palazzolo was in fact utilized the registration of another club C.S.D. Enzo Grasso, which focused on futsal since 2013 and splitting the registration at FIGC. S.C. Palazzolo also participated in the division Promozione Sicily immediately, which previously participated by Enzo Grasso.

Despite the club finished as the fifth of 2014–15 Promozione Sicily, the team was promoted to Eccellenza Sicily to fill the vacancies.

S.C. Palazzolo won 2016–17 Eccellenza Sicily, the fifth level of Italian football pyramid in April 2017. The club promoted directly to Serie D, the fourth level of the pyramid as well as the top division of non professional league. However, S.C. Palazzolo was relegated at the end of 2017–18 Serie D season.

In 2018–19 season the club signed former professional footballer Fernando Spinelli as well as other. The club finished as the runner-up at the group stage as well as losing finalist in the promotion playoffs.

Players

Current squad

Honours
 Eccellenza Sicily
 2017

References

External links
  

Football clubs in Italy
Football clubs in Sicily
Association football clubs established in 1954
1954 establishments in Italy
Palazzolo Acreide